The 2021 CAFA U-20 Women's Championship was the inaugural edition of the CAFA U-20 Women's Championship, the international youth Women's football championship organized by the CAFA contested by the women's under-20 national teams of Central Asia. The tournament was hosted by Tajikistan between 11 and 17 June 2021.

Uzbekistan won the title to become the first CAFA U-20 Women's Championship champion, edging out IR Iran after a dramatic final day which ended by a tie that led the Uzbek Team to top the standing on goal difference.

Participating nations
A total of 5 (out of 6) CAFA member national teams entered the tournament.

Did not enter

Venues
Matches were held at the Republican Central Stadium.

Match officials
Referees

  Yasmin Haidari
  Fatemeh Nasiri
  Malika Kadirova
  Nodira Mirzoeva
  Roziabonu Yusupova

Assistant referees

  Farishta Shaikhmiri
  Habibeh Rabavganjinehketab
  Ramina Tsoi
  Munisa Mirzoeva

Squads

Main tournament 
The main tournament schedule was announced on 4 June 2021.

Goalscorers

Player awards
The following awards were given at the conclusion of the tournament:

References

External links

Sport in Dushanbe

2021 CAFA U-20 Women's Championship
2021 in Tajikistani football
2021 in women's association football
2021 in youth association football
Women's football in Tajikistan